Luca Pizzi (born 18 March 1974) is an Italian paralympic cyclist who won a two medals at the 2012 Summer Paralympics as guide of his the brother of the Paralympic champion Ivano Pizzi.

References

External links
 

1974 births
Living people
Paralympic cyclists of Italy
Paralympic gold medalists for Italy
Paralympic silver medalists for Italy
Medalists at the 2012 Summer Paralympics
Paralympic medalists in cycling
Cyclists at the 2012 Summer Paralympics